O2+ may refer to:
 Dioxygenyl
 Doubly ionized oxygen